James Newbury FitzGerald (1837–1907) was an American  bishop of the Methodist Episcopal Church, elected in 1888.

Biography
James Newbury FitzGerald was born at Newark, New Jersey on July 27, 1837. He received the degree of D. D. from Wesleyan University in 1880 and that of LL. D. from Hamline University in 1889.

In 1895 he made the episcopal visitation to the South American and European conferences.  He died at Hong Kong on April 4, 1907, on an episcopal  visitation to the Oriental mission conferences.

See also
List of bishops of the United Methodist Church

References

Leete, Frederick DeLand, Methodist Bishops.  Nashville, The Methodist Publishing House, 1948.

1837 births
1907 deaths
American Methodist bishops
Bishops of the Methodist Episcopal Church
Wesleyan University alumni
Hamline University alumni
19th-century American clergy